Juan José "Juanjo" Sánchez Purata (born 9 January 1998) is a Mexican professional footballer who plays as a centre-back for Major League Soccer club Atlanta United, on loan from Tigres UANL.

Career statistics

Club

Honours
Tigres UANL
Campeones Cup: 2018
CONCACAF Champions League: 2020

References

1998 births
Living people
Mexican footballers
Association football defenders
Tigres UANL footballers
Liga MX players
Sportspeople from San Luis Potosí
Atlanta United FC players
Major League Soccer players